Shane Stefanutto (born 12 January 1980) is an Australian former professional footballer who is the Technical Director of Brisbane Roar. He previously played for Brisbane Strikers, Lillestrøm, Lyn, North Queensland Fury, Brisbane Roar, Olympic FC and Australian national team.

Club career
Stefanutto trained at the Queensland Academy of Sport before playing for the Brisbane Strikers in the defunct National Soccer League from 1998 to 2004, before transferring Lillestrøm in Norway. On 26 August 2007, Stefanutto scored his first goal for LSK in his 112th match, against Aalesund. The goal came from a long-range free kick. His contract with Lillestrøm expired at the end of the 2007 season, and he played for Lyn Oslo in the 2008 season, before signing for North Queensland Fury on 5 August 2009.

He sustained a potentially season-ending knee injury in a match against Perth Glory after an innocuous challenge with Adriano Pellegrino, which was presumed to be a ruptured anterior cruciate ligament. The injury hindered his World Cup 2010 selection hopes. On 13 April 2010, Stefanutto signed a contract with the Brisbane Roar, which would see him play there for the next three seasons.

Shane announced his retirement from professional football on 30 April 2016 at the end of the 2015–16 A-League season.

In June 2016, he signed with National Premier Leagues Queensland side Olympic FC.

International career
On 2 November 2006 he received his first call-up to the Australian national team for an international friendly against Ghana, in London but did not play. On 24 March 2007 Stefanutto won his first international cap in a friendly match against China.  He remained out of the team for more than two years before receiving a recall in Australia's final qualification match for the 2010 World Cup against Japan in June 2009.

Personal life
Stefanutto is also an Italian citizen, and his family originates from the town of Latisana, near the city of Udine, in the region of Friuli-Venezia Giulia. He is married to Tammy Woolf and they have two children, Stella and Max. Following his professional retirement in 2016, Stefanutto transitioned into Brisbane Roar's administration staff, re-joining the club as their Media & Communications Officer.

A-League statistics

1 - includes A-League final series statistics
2 - includes FIFA Club World Cup statistics; AFC Champions League statistics are included in season commencing after group stages (i.e. ACL and A-League seasons etc.)

Honours

Club
Lillestrøm:
Norwegian Cup: 2007

Brisbane Roar:
 A-League Premiership: 2010–11, 2013–14
 A-League Championship: 2010–11, 2011–12, 2013–14

References

External links
 Brisbane Roar profile
 OzFootball profile

1980 births
Australian soccer players
Australian people of Italian descent
Australia international soccer players
National Soccer League (Australia) players
Brisbane Strikers FC players
Lillestrøm SK players
Northern Fury FC players
Brisbane Roar FC players
A-League Men players
Eliteserien players
Expatriate footballers in Norway
Australian expatriate sportspeople in Norway
Australian expatriate soccer players
Sportspeople from Cairns
Soccer players from Queensland
Living people
Association football fullbacks